The 1884 Rhode Island gubernatorial election was held on April 2, 1884. Incumbent Republican Augustus O. Bourn defeated Democratic nominee Thomas W. Segar with 62.39% of the vote.

General election

Candidates
Augustus O. Bourn, Republican
Thomas W. Segar, Democratic

Results

References

1884
Rhode Island
Gubernatorial